Julian Wheeler (born April 22, 1971) is an American former professional boxer who competed from 1993 to 2002. He is the former WBC Continental Americas super featherweight and USBA lightweight champion.

Amateur highlights 
1992 United States Amateur Featherweight Champion
1992 Qualified for the United States Olympic Team as a Featherweight, at the Olympic Trials in Worcester, Massachusetts. Results were:
Wayne Chandler won on points
Willie Jorrin won on points
Ivan Robinson won on points
Ivan Robinson won on points, this match was at the Box-Offs in Phoenix, Arizona.
Competed at the 1992 Barcelona Olympic Games as a Featherweight. Result was:
Ramazan Palyani (Russia/Unified Team) lost on points (4-8)
1993 United States Amateur Featherweight Champion
1993 competed as a Featherweight at the World Championships in Tampere, Finland. Results were:
Paul Griffin (Ireland) won on points
Ramazan Palyani (Georgia) lost on points

Professional career 
Wheeler turned pro in 1993 and had some good success.

NABF Super Featherweight title 
After winning his first 11 bouts, he lost to Mexican American Robert Garcia for the NABF Super Featherweight title in 1995.

His career went downhill shortly thereafter and he suffered defeats to Juan Manuel Márquez, Jorge Páez (twice), and Juan Lazcano.

IBC Light Welterweight title 
In December 1998, Wheeler beat an undefeated Victor McKinnis to win the IBC Light Welterweight title.

He retired in 2002 after losing a close decision to Leavander Johnson in an IBF Lightweight Title Eliminator.

References

External links 

1965 births
Living people
Boxers from Virginia
Featherweight boxers
Boxers at the 1992 Summer Olympics
Olympic boxers of the United States
Sportspeople from Virginia Beach, Virginia
Welterweight boxers
Light-welterweight boxers
Lightweight boxers
Super-featherweight boxers
American male boxers
African-American boxers
21st-century African-American people
20th-century African-American sportspeople